Hamja Ahsan is an radical left wing artist, writer, curator and activist. A multi-disciplinary artist, his practice has involved conceptual writing, building archives, performance, video, sound and making zines. Reoccurring themes have been explorations around state crime, contemporary Islamophobia, repression of civil liberties under the War on Terror, and prison solidarity. 

Hamja is the author of Shy Radicals: The Antisystemic Politics of the Militant Introvert, published by Book Works in 2017, currently in its fourth edition run. In Shy Radicals, he argues that shy people are oppressed and presents a constitution for Aspergistan, a state for shy people. 

In 2019, he was awarded the Grand Prize at the thirty-third Ljubljana Biennial of Graphic Arts for the artwork 'Aspergistan Referendum' based on Shy Radicals. Hamja was selected as a participating artist for Documenta fifteen. Hamja lives and works in London.

Early life 
Ahsan was born in London in 1981 to Bengali Muslim parents. He grew up in Tooting and Mitcham and attended Graveney Secondary School. In 2005, Hamja attend Central St. Martin's and completed a BA Fine Art, receiving a first. He was taught by Anne Tallentire. He then completed an MA in Critical Writing and Curatorial Practice at Chelsea College of Arts.

Shy Radicals 
In 2017, Hamja Ahsan's book Shy Radicals: The Antisystemic Politics of the Militant Introvert was published by Book Works. A work of speculative fiction that conjures a radical new structuring of the world, defined by 'extrovert supremacy' and a global resistance of shy and introvert activism. A manifesto for a 'Black Panthers' like party but for shy people as Ahsan describes. The book has quietly and increasingly being recognised as a significant literary achievement, with its readership represented across the world and the book also appearing on numerous university reading lists. Hamja has been invited to do readings or teach modules on his work across the United Kingdom, Europe and North America.

The book is taught at Ivy League level on curriculum Neurodiversity, Politics and Culture at Brown University.

In 2020, Shy Radicals was adapted into a short film, produced by Ridley Scott's film company, Black Dog Films and directed by Tom Dream.

Art and Curatorial Practice 
Hamja has been an artist, writer, curator and cultural organiser since the early 2000's. He is the co-founder of the DIY Cultures Zine Festival in 2013. He has presented art projects at the NY Art Book Fair at MOMA PS1; Tate Modern, London; Gwangju Biennale; Shanaakht festival, Karachi; and Ujazdowski Castle Centre for Contemporary Art (CCA) in Warsaw and was a resident artist at Jan van Eyck Academie in Maastricht in 2020–21.

Activism 
Hamja Ahsan was a campaigner in the case of his brother, Syed Talha Ahsan. Through this work, in 2012 he was shortlisted for the Liberty Human Rights award for the 'Free Talha Ahsan' campaign on extradition and detention without trial under the War on Terror, highlighting the effective use of creative practice, art and film. The 'Free Talha' campaign received support from many figures across the world, including Riz Ahmed, Caroline Lucas and A.L Kennedy. His work, as an artist and campaigner also has championed various other causes that deal with state violence and harshness.

In 2022, Hamja Ahsan called German Chancellor Olaf Scholz a “fascist pig” in a Facebook post. President of the German-Israeli Society (DIG), Volker Beck, then accused Hamja Ahsan of relativizing National Socialism: “It is part of the repertoire of left-wing and right-wing extremist agitators to describe everything and everything that is politically undesirable as fascism or National Socialism. In fact, this is always a relativization of fascism and National Socialism.”. His statement raised public criticism in Germany and he was banned from Documenta fifteen but his works continued to be shown at the exhibition. The work has attracted criticism in the context of the Documenta fifteen anti-Semitism controversy, as one of the light boxes exhibited as part of his work is inscribed with "PFLFC - Popular Front Liberation Fried Chicken", which alludes to the "Popular Front for the Liberation of Palestine" (PFLP). The PFLP is classified as a terrorist organisation by the EU and the US.

Ahsan has supported the Palestine BDS campaign ever since Operation Cast Lead, which he described as a genocide.

References 

Living people
British activists
1981 births
British writers